Woo!ah! (stylized in all lowercase) is a South Korean girl group launched by NV Entertainment, and currently consists of members Nana, Wooyeon, Sora, Lucy, and Minseo. The group debuted on May 13, 2020. Originally a six-member group, Songyee left in August 2020 due to personal reasons.

History
On March 20, 2020, the girl group Woo!ah! was announced, and was revealed to be produced by NV Entertainment's director Han Ji-seok and CEO Kim Kyu-sang. Han is an overseas entertainment expert and had worked in SM Entertainment and Kakao M, while Kim is a creative director and had produced and directed numerous artists representing Korea.

2020: Debut with Exclamation, reorganization as 5 members and Qurious
On April 24, the release schedule for the group's debut single album, Exclamation, was published. Subsequently, image and solo film teasers for the members were released in the order: Wooyeon, Minseo, Lucy, Songyee, Sora, and Nana. The group made their debut on May 13 through a press showcase held at the Spigen Hall in Gangnam. However, the releases of the single album Exclamation and the music video for the title track woo!ah! was postponed to May 15, in order to show more completeness in the group through improvements in both releases.

On August 14, NV Entertainment announced that Songyee would leave the group due to personal reasons.

The group made their comeback on November 24 with their second single album Qurious. The group held a press showcase and a comeback showcase for the release one day earlier.

2021–present: Wish, "Catch the Stars", Joy and Pit-a-Pat
On May 27, 2021, the group released their third single album Wish and it's lead single "Purple".

On January 4, 2022, the group released their first pre-release digital single titled "Catch the Stars".

On June 9, 2022, the group released their first extended play Joy and it's lead single "Danger". The group's previous single "Catch the Stars" was also included in the EP. 

On November 16, 2022, the group released their fourth single album Pit-a-Pat and it's lead single "Rollercoaster".

Members
Current
 Nana (나나) – leader
 Wooyeon (우연)
 Sora (소라)
 Lucy (루시)
 Minseo (민서)

Former
 Songyee (송이)

Discography

Extended plays

Single albums

Singles

Collaborations

Videography

Music videos

Awards and nominations

Listicles

References

 

South Korean girl groups
2020 establishments in South Korea
Musical groups established in 2020
Musical groups from Seoul
K-pop music groups